The 1956 Pittsburgh Steelers season was the franchise's 24th in the National Football League.

Offseason

NFL Draft

Regular season

Schedule

Note: Intra-conference opponents are in bold text.

Game summaries

Week 1 (Sunday September 30, 1956): Washington Redskins 

at Forbes Field, Pittsburgh, Pennsylvania

 Game time: 
 Game weather: 
 Game attendance: 27,718
 Referee: 
 TV announcers:

Scoring drives:

 Pittsburgh – Chandnois 2 run (Glick kick)
 Washington – FG Baker 42
 Pittsburgh – Marchibroda 1 run (Glick kick)
 Washington – FG Baker 41
 Pittsburgh – FG Glick 27
 Pittsburgh – Chandnois 17 pass from Marchibroda (kick blocked)
 Pittsburgh – Chandnois 5 run (Glick kick)
 Washington – Meilinger 13 pass from LeBaron (Baker kick)

Week 2 (Saturday October 6, 1956): Cleveland Browns  

at Forbes Field, Pittsburgh, Pennsylvania

 Game time: 
 Game weather: 
 Game attendance: 35,398
 Referee: 
 TV announcers:

Scoring drives:

 Cleveland – Ratterman 1 run (Groza kick)
 Pittsburgh – FG Glick 30
 Pittsburgh – Chandnois 1 run (Glik kick)
 Cleveland – Modzelewski 13 run (Groza kick)

Week 3 (Sunday October 14, 1956): Philadelphia Eagles  

at Forbes Field, Pittsburgh, Pennsylvania

 Game time: 
 Game weather: 
 Game attendance: 31,375
 Referee: 
 TV announcers:

Scoring drives:

 Philadelphia – Schaefer 1 run (Walston kick)
 Philadelphia – Walston 51 pass from Thomason (Walston kick)
 Philadelphia – Bell 28 interception (Walston kick)
 Philadelphia – Bredice 40 pass from Thomason (Walston kick)
 Pittsburgh – Perry 15 pass from Marchibroda (Glick kick)
 Pittsburgh – Mathews 64 pass from Marchibroda (Glick kick)
 Pittsburgh – Mathews 20 pass from Marchibroda (Glick kick)
 Philadelphia – Keller 51 run (Walston kick)

Week 4 (Sunday October 21, 1956): New York Giants  

at Yankee Stadium, Bronx, New York

 Game time: 
 Game weather: 
 Game attendance: 48,108
 Referee: 
 TV announcers:

Scoring drives:

 Pittsburgh – FG Glick 35
 New York Giants – MacAfee 14 pass from Conerly (Agajanian kick)
 New York Giants – Webster 21 pass from Conerly (Agajanian kick)
 New York Giants – FG Agajanian 14
 New York Giants – Gifford 1 run (Agajanian kick)
 New York Giants – Rote 19 pass from Conerly (Agajanian kick)
 Pittsburgh – Nickel 14 pass from Marchibroda (Glick kick)
 New York Giants – Filpski 35 run (Agajanian kick)

Week 5 (Sunday October 28, 1956): Cleveland Browns  

at Cleveland Municipal Stadium, Cleveland, Ohio

 Game time: 
 Game weather: 
 Game attendance: 50,358
 Referee: 
 TV announcers:

Scoring drives:

 Cleveland – Lavelli 68 pass from Parilli (kick failed)
 Cleveland – Paul 35 interception (Groza kick)
 Pittsburgh – Nickel 10 pass from Marchibroda (Glick kick)
 Pittsburgh – Chandnois 1 run (Glick kick)
 Pittsburgh – Perry 75 pass from Marchibroda (Glick kick)
 Cleveland – FG Groza 28
 Pittsburgh – FG Glick 11

Week 6 (Sunday November 4, 1956): New York Giants  

at Forbes Field, Pittsburgh, Pennsylvania

 Game time: 
 Game weather: 
 Game attendance: 31,240
 Referee: 
 TV announcers:

Scoring Drives:

 New York Giants – Webster 1 run (Agajanian kick)
 New York Giants – FG Agajanian 32
 Pittsburgh – Watson 1 run (Glick kick)
 New York Giants – Rote 3 pass from Conerly (Agajanian kick)
 Pittsburgh – Watson 6 run (Glick kick)

Week 7 (Sunday November 11, 1956): Philadelphia Eagles  

at Connie Mack Stadium, Philadelphia, Pennsylvania

 Game time: 
 Game weather: 
 Game attendance: 22,652
 Referee: Jack Glascott
 TV announcers:

Scoring drives:

 Pittsburgh – Marchibroda 1 run (Glick kick)
 Philadelphia – Burnine 35 pass from Thomason (Walston kick)
 Philadelphia – Keller 1 run (Walston kick)

Week 8 (Sunday November 18, 1956): Chicago Cardinals  

at Forbes Field, Pittsburgh, Pennsylvania

 Game time: 
 Game weather: 
 Game attendance: 24,086
 Referee: 
 TV announcers:

Scoring drives:

 Pittsburgh – Rogel 13 run (Glick kick)
 Pittsburgh – Butler 6 fumble run (Glick kick)
 Chicago Cardinals – Matson 45 pass from McHan (Summerall kick)

Week 9 (Sunday November 25, 1956): Chicago Cardinals  

at Comiskey Park, Chicago, Illinois

 Game time: 
 Game weather: 
 Game attendance: 17,724
 Referee: 
 TV announcers:

Scoring drives:

 Chicago Cardinals – Root 3 run (Summerall kick)
 Pittsburgh – Mathews 29 pass from Marchibroda (Watson kick)
 Chicago Cardinals – Matson 1 run (Summerall kick)
 Chicago Cardinals – FG Summerall 27
 Chicago Cardinals – Matson 79 run (Summerall kick)
 Chicago Cardinals – Childress 34 pass from Root (Summerall kick)
 Pittsburgh – Ford 3 run (Watson kick)
 Pittsburgh – Nickel 4 pass from Marchibroda (kick failed)
 Chicago Cardinals – McHan 1 run (Summerall kick)
 Pittsburgh – Ford 4 run (Watson kick)

Week 10 (Sunday December 2, 1956): Los Angeles Rams  

at Forbes Field, Pittsburgh, Pennsylvania

 Game time: 
 Game weather: 
 Game attendance: 20,540
 Referee: 
 TV announcers:

Scoring drives:

 Los Angeles – McFadin 21 fumble run (kick failed)
 Pittsburgh – Nickel 22 pass from Scarbath (Watson kick)
 Pittsburgh – FG Watson 16
 Los Angeles – Boyd 61 pass from Wade (Richter kick)
 Pittsburgh – Mathews 6 pass from Marchibroda (Watson kick)
 Pittsburgh – Rogel 1 run (Watson kick)
 Pittsburgh – Nickel 47 pass from Scarbath (kick failed)

Week 11 (Sunday December 9, 1956): Detroit Lions  

at Briggs Stadium, Detroit, Michigan

 Game time: 
 Game weather: 
 Game attendance: 52,124
 Referee: 
 TV announcers:

Scoring drives:

 Detroit – Hart 20 pass from Layne (Layne kick)
 Detroit – Gedman 5 run (Layne kick)
 Pittsburgh – Watson 1 run (Watson kick)
 Detroit – Lary 73 interception (Layne kick)
 Detroit – Christiansen 66 punt return (Layne kick)
 Detroit – Christiansen 66 punt return (Layne kick)
 Detroit – FG Layne 13
 Detroit – Reichow 41 pass from Gilmer (Layne kick)

Week 12 (Sunday December 16, 1956): Washington Redskins  

at Griffith Stadium, Washington, DC

 Game time: 
 Game weather: 
 Game attendance: 49,086
 Referee: 
 TV announcers:

Scoring drives:

 Pittsburgh – Watson 1 run (Watson kick)
 Pittsburgh – Mathews 48 pass from Marchibroda (Watson kick)
 Pittsburgh – Butler 10 pass from Marchibroda (Watson kick)
 Pittsburgh – Safety, Dorow tackled by McPeak in end zone

Standings

References

Pittsburgh Steelers seasons
Pittsburgh Steelers
Pitts